The Riviera is an historic apartment building at 270 Huntington Avenue in Boston, Massachusetts. Built in 1923, it is a seven-story brick and concrete structure developed by Coleman & Gilbert and designed by Fred A. Norcross. Norcross was a prolific builder of apartment and tenement blocks for the city's burgeoning immigrant population. The building has an asymmetrical facade, divided into four similarly styled sections, each of which has a band of three sash windows on the left and a projecting polygonal bay on the right. A few of the three-window groups have shallow balconies with low balustrades in front of them.

The building was listed on the National Register of Historic Places in 1995.

See also
National Register of Historic Places listings in southern Boston, Massachusetts

References

Buildings and structures completed in 1923
Apartment buildings on the National Register of Historic Places in Massachusetts
Apartment buildings in Boston
National Register of Historic Places in Boston
Fenway–Kenmore